The 2022 IHF Wheelchair Handball World Championship is the first edition of the tournament. It is being held in Hassan Moustafa Sports Hall in the 6th of October City, Egypt from 22 to 25 September 2022.

The competition features six teams, i.e., the host, one from Asia, and two each from Europe, and South and Central America. The competition is played with mixed teams, i.e., each team must have at least two female players, while at least one female player per team must be on the court at any time.

Qualification

Standings

Knockout stage

Fifth place game

Third place game

Final

Final ranking

Team rosters

Brazil
Head coach: Samuel Vieira, Assistant coach: Gévelyn Almeida, Official: Rudney Uezu

Chile
Head coach: William Andrade, Physician: Raul Smith, Physiotherapist: Amaya Iribarren

Egypt
Head coach: Wael Abdelaaty Sayed Aly, Assistant coach: Ibrahim Mohamed Nasreldin Younes, Official: Karam Mohamed Morsy Abdelkader, Physiotherapist: Romany Nabil Welson Hanna

India
Head coach: Anand Bajirao Mane, Assistant coach: Louis George Meprath, Official: Harjit Kaur Singh, Official: Kapil Kailash Agarwal

Netherlands
Head coach: Menno de Klerk, Official: Wilma Reincke, Official: Henne Van Es

Slovenia
Head coach: Tone Barič, Official: Maja Užmah, Support staff: Jožef Jeraj, Physiotherapist: Azra Imamović

References

Website

Wheelchair Handball World Championship
Wheelchair
International handball competitions hosted by Egypt
2022
Wheelchair Handball World Championship
Sports competitions in Cairo
Wheelchair Handball World Championship